The chestnut-bellied starling (Lamprotornis pulcher) is a species of starling in the family Sturnidae. This is a common resident in arid Sahelian acacia savanna, namely in Burkina Faso, Cameroon, Chad, Eritrea, Ethiopia, Gambia, Ghana, Guinea, Guinea-Bissau, Ivory Coast, Mali, Mauritania, Niger, Nigeria, Senegal, Sudan, and Togo.

Description 
This is one of the rufous-bellied starlings, and the only one in most of its range. The pale eye differentiates it from Hildebrandt's and Shelley's starlings, while the absence of a white breast band separates it from the Splendid Starling. Predominantly glossy dark-green to blue, with a distinct dark (and not glossy) head and breast.

References

Birds of Africa South of Sahara, second edition; Ian Sinclair and Peter Ryan

Lamprotornis
Birds of the Sahel
Birds described in 1776
Taxonomy articles created by Polbot